Daniel William Harvie (born 14 July 1998) is a Scottish professional footballer who plays as a  wing-back for  club Milton Keynes Dons.

Club career

Aberdeen
Harvie joined the academy of Aberdeen at the age of 11 and progressed through several age groups. He made his first-team debut for as an injury-time substitute in a Scottish Premiership 2–1 away win over Partick Thistle on 8 March 2016.

On 3 August 2016, Harvie joined Scottish Championship club Dumbarton on loan, initially until January 2017. Whilst on loan, he scored his first professional goal in a 4–4 draw with Ayr United in December 2016. His loan was later extended until the end of the season. Following 34 appearances and three goals, he picked up the club's Young Player of the Year award at the end of the season

Harvie returned to Aberdeen for the 2017–18 campaign, but found first team opportunities limited and he was released by the club at the end of the season.

Ayr United
After leaving Aberdeen, Harvie signed for newly-promoted Scottish Championship side Ayr United on a two-year deal on 26 June 2018. He later went on to be named the club's Player of the Year for the 2019–20 season.

Milton Keynes Dons 
After two seasons with Ayr United, Harvie joined League One club Milton Keynes Dons for an undisclosed fee on 27 July 2020.  He scored his first goal for the club on 3 October 2020 in a 1–1 draw at home to Ipswich Town. On 1 September 2022, Harvie signed a contract extension keeping him at the club beyond the end of the 2022–23 season.

International career
Harvie played for the Scotland U17 side in 2015. He was called up to the Scotland U19 squad in August 2016. Harvie was named in the Scotland U19 squad for the elite round of the European Championships in March 2017, alongside Dumbarton loanee teammate Ross McCrorie.

Selected for the Scotland under-21 squad in the 2018 Toulon Tournament, the team lost to Turkey in a penalty-out and finished fourth.

Career statistics

Honours
Individual
Dumbarton Young Player of the Year: 2016–17
Ayr United Player of the Year: 2019–20

References

External links

1998 births
Living people
Scottish footballers
Aberdeen F.C. players
Dumbarton F.C. players
Ayr United F.C. players
Milton Keynes Dons F.C. players
Association football forwards
Scottish Professional Football League players
Scotland youth international footballers
Scotland under-21 international footballers